Svetlana Žuchová (born 1976) is a Slovak writer and translator. She was educated at Vienna University and Comenius University in Bratislava. As a short story writer, she has twice won prizes in the Slovak literary competition Poviedka. Her first collection of short stories Dulce de Leche appeared in 2003 and won the Ivan Krasko Prize. She has published three novels since then: Yesim (2006), Zlodeji a svedkovia (Thieves and Witnesses, 2011), and Obrazy zo života M. (Scenes from the Life of M., 2013). All three have made the shortlist for Anasoft Litera, Slovakia's most prestigious literary prize. In 2015, Obrazy zo života M. won Zuchova the EU Prize for Literature. The novel has been translated into Italian with the title Marisia. Frammenti di una vita by Tiziana D'Amico for Mimesis.

Žuchová's translations include works by Michel Faber, Sarah Kane, Sophie Kinsella and Sabine Thiesler. She lives and works in Prague.

References

1976 births
Living people
Slovak writers
Slovak translators
University of Vienna alumni
Comenius University alumni